Swanston Street is a major thoroughfare in the centre of Melbourne, Victoria, Australia. It is one of the main streets of the Melbourne central business district and was laid out in 1837 as part of the original Hoddle Grid. The street vertically bisects Melbourne's city centre and is famous as the world's busiest tram corridor, for its heritage buildings and as a shopping strip.

Swanston Street runs roughly north–south in-between Russell Street to the east and Elizabeth Street to the west. To the south it becomes St Kilda Road after the intersection with Flinders Street, whilst the road's northern end is in the suburb of Carlton at Melbourne Cemetery. This northern section was originally named Madeline Street. The street is named after merchant, banker and politician Charles Swanston.

History
Swanston Street was one of the main north–south streets originally laid out in the 1837 Hoddle Grid. Originally carrying pedestrians and horse-drawn cart traffic, the street resembled many typical European avenues of the 19th century. By the end of the 19th century it was carrying one of the major tram lines through the city. With the advent of the automobile in the early 20th century, the street became a major thoroughfare, carrying automobile traffic between areas north of the city and St Kilda Road throughout most of the 20th century.

The southern half of the street historically had problems with heavy traffic and carbon monoxide pollution, homelessness and loitering, and a plethora of discount stores, fast food outlets, sex shops and strip joints, throughout the later half of the 20th century.

In March 1992 the street was closed to daytime private through-traffic between Flinders and La Trobe Streets, roughly half its length. This section is known as Swanston Street Walk. Swanston Street was redeveloped in 1992 with a number of public sculptures being established through the Percent for Art Program. The most famous of these statues is of a small bronze dog called Larry La Trobe by Melbourne artist, Pamela Irving. By the turn of the 21st century, the street carried nine tram routes, with the frequency of trams being the highest in Melbourne.

In November 2008, newly elected Lord Mayor of Melbourne Robert Doyle proposed to return private vehicle traffic to the street. The move attracted opposition from the Public Transport Users Association, Australian Greens and Bicycle Victoria. This proposal was rejected and by January 2010, plans to make the entire length of Swanston Street in the city car-free were announced by the Lord Mayor himself, representing a complete reversal on the issue.

Use for marches, rallies and protests
Many marches, rallies and protests involve the use of Swanston Street, resulting in planned and unexpected road closures. It is used for many annual events, including the Moomba parade, and the Anzac Day parade, which passes through much of the city centre, but uses Swanston Street as a centrepiece on its way to the Shrine of Remembrance in St Kilda Road, as well as the AFL Grand Final parade, Melbourne Cup parade and others.

Car-free proposals
Swanston Street was one of the busiest roads in Melbourne, carrying large private automobile volumes, before being converted to a restricted traffic strip in 1992. The street was made partially car-free, with limited exemptions for small freight, buses and private automobiles during certain times of the day. Since the 1990s, proposals for the street to become entirely car-free have continuously gained support and momentum.

On 27 January 2010, it was announced that the entire length of Swanston Street would become car-free. The $25.6 million proposal included plans for several city squares along the street and several large tram stops. Aside from trams, the only motorised vehicular access is for small-scale freight at certain times, and emergency vehicles. The construction program commenced in late 2011 and was completed in late 2012.

Notable buildings 

Many of Melbourne's most noteworthy precincts and prominent buildings face Swanston Street as the city's historic main avenue, including:

 Flinders Street railway station
 Federation Square
 Young and Jackson Hotel
 Nicholas Building
 St Paul's Cathedral
 Melbourne Town Hall
 Capitol Theatre
 City Square
 Westin Hotel Melbourne
 Manchester Unity Building
 Curtin House
 Chinatown Archway
 QV Village
 State Library of Victoria
 Melbourne Central Shopping Centre 
 City Baths 
Both the University of Melbourne and RMIT University also have campus buildings fronting Swanston Street.

Transport
Tram routes 1, 3, 5, 6, 16, 64, 67 and 72 currently run along the street, with the frequency of trams making Swanston Street the world's busiest tram corridor. Two of the busiest railway stations in Melbourne are located near the street, with the suburban railway network hub Flinders Street station at its southern end and, further north, the underground Melbourne Central station at the intersection of La Trobe Street. The Metro Tunnel is being constructed under Swanston Street, and should be completed in 2025.

Swanston Street is also a major route for commuting cyclists to and through the city, with bike lanes from the northern suburbs and from St Kilda Road in the south, and the Capital City Trail on the Southbank of the Yarra River.

The parking of tour buses along the street caused controversy in September 2008 when a young cyclist was killed by a bus as it turned out of a parking spot. There had previously been calls to the council to relocate the large buses from the street where there was little space between buses and trams.

Swanston Street was previously served by bus services to Gardenvale and Middle Brighton. When Melbourne-Brighton Bus Lines' licence periodically came up for review, the Melbourne City Council and Melbourne & Metropolitan Tramways Board always opposed. Finally the buses were removed from Swanston Street in October 1989, by which time they were operated by the Public Transport Corporation.

In popular culture
Swanston Street was the shooting location for the 1976 video for AC/DC's song "It's a Long Way to the Top (If You Wanna Rock 'n' Roll)". It led to a nearby street being renamed ACDC Lane in honour of the music video.

It is also referenced in The Distillers' song "Dismantle Me", as singer Brody Dalle is originally from Melbourne, as well as TISM's song "Get Thee in My Behind Satan" and Courtney Barnett's "Elevator Operator".

Jane Halifax (Rebecca Gibney) of the Halifax f.p. television series is shown living in an apartment at 339 Swanston Street (Jensen House; now converted into a UniLodge) opposite the State Library.

Gallery

See also

References

External links

Streets in Melbourne City Centre
Shopping districts and streets in Australia
Landmarks in Melbourne